Vesyolye Rebyata (which means "jolly fellows") was a Soviet VIA (vocal instrumental ensemble) band formed in 1966, in Moscow. It became one of the most successful and best known VIA bands of all time. Its debut album sold 15,795,000 copies and its membership included at various times such popular Soviet era singers as Alla Pugachova, Alexander Gradsky, and Alexander Barykin. As of 2006, the band had sold a record-shattering 179,850,000 records.

History 
Vesyolye Rebyata was a VIA band created in 1966 by the Soviet pianist and composer Pavel Slobodkin. Two years later, the band won the All-Soviet competition for best youthful song performance and in 1969, they won the All-Soviet competition for best song.

In 1970, the Soviet recording company Melodia (Melody) released the band's first record, which sold a remarkable 15,795,000 copies. The band hits are "People meet", "You don't care", "With each other's hand", "Portrait by Picasso", "How beautiful is this world", "Song, my song".

In 1971, Vesyolye Rebyata gave a series of concerts in Czechoslovakia, performing in the concert hall Lucerne in Prague.

In 1973, the band recorded one of the best known albums, "Love - a huge country". In 1974, Slobodkin invited a young female vocalist named Alla Pugacheva to perform with the band. In 1975, Pugacheva won the Golden Orpheus award in Bulgaria with the song Arlekino that launched her now legendary music career in the Soviet Union. In 1976, the band toured East Germany, Czechoslovakia, and Bulgaria and won a number of musical awards in those countries.

In 1980, the band released a new LP titled "We should be friends" and took part in the cultural component of the 1980 Olympic Games in Moscow. Veselie Rebiata followed this up in 1981 with another LP, this one titled "Disco club". That same year, they won the top prize at the All-Soviet pop and rock music festival held in Yerevan.

In 1983, the band recorded a new album titled "Banana islands". In 1985, they won the grand prize at an international music competition in Bratislava for the song "Wandering artists". The same year, the band did an international tour, performing in Finland, East Germany, Hungary, and Cuba. In 1986, they recorded their sixth album, titled "Just a minute". From 1986 until 1992, Veselie Rebiata was repeatedly nominated to the "Song of the year" Soviet festival. In 1991, the band released a double album of best hits to celebrate its 25th anniversary.

In 2005, the band is reconstituted with new membership and in 2006 they are given the "Platinum record #1" award for setting the record in Russia and Eastern Europe for most records sold at 179,850,000. In 2007, the band released two CDs: "Love - child of the planet" and "When we are quiet together". In 2008, they took part in the international music festival Diskoteka 80s, sponsored by the Russian radio station Avtoradio.

In 2011, the band released a new album with the French title "Cherchez la..." and once again performed at the now annual "Diskoteka 80s" festival. In 2012, the band released its ninth album titled "Write me a letter".

In August 2017, Pavel Slobodkin had passed away and the group was disbanded.

References

External links 
 
 http://www.veselyerebjata.ru/ - official site 
 

1966 establishments in Russia
1992 disestablishments in Russia
2005 establishments in Russia
2017 disestablishments in Russia
Musical groups from Moscow
Russian rock music groups
Beat groups
Alternative dance musical groups
Russian boy bands
Russian pop rock music groups
Russian new wave musical groups
Soviet rock music groups
Musical groups established in 1966
Musical groups disestablished in 1992
Musical groups reestablished in 2005
Musical groups disestablished in 2017